Tuixent-La Vansa is a ski resort for Nordic skiing in Josa i Tuixén and la Vansa i Fórnols, Catalonia, opened in 1978. It borders the Cadí-Moixeró Natural Park.

Green circuit: 1.8 km
Blue circuit: 7.5 km
Red circuit: 13 km
Black circuit: 10 km
Skating circuit: 3.5 km

External links
Tuixent-La Vansa website
Map of the trails

Ski areas and resorts in Catalonia